The Schock 35 is an American sailboat that was designed by W. Shad Turner as a racer-cruiser and first built in 1984.

The design is a development of the Santana 35, with a longer keel and higher mast.

Production
The design was built by W. D. Schock Corp in the United States, starting in 1984. An updated model was still being built in 2011, but it is now out of production. A total of 83 boats were completed.

Design
The Schock 35 is a recreational keelboat, built predominantly of fiberglass, with wood trim. It has a masthead sloop rig, a raked stem, a reverse transom, an internally mounted spade-type rudder controlled by a tiller and a fixed fin keel or optional shoal-draft wing keel.

The design has sleeping accommodation for six people, with a double "V"-berth in the bow cabin, two straight settee berths in the main cabin and two quarter berths aft under the cockpit. The galley is located on the port side at the companionway ladder. The galley is equipped with a two-burner stove, ice box and a sink. A navigation station is opposite the galley, on the starboard side. The head is located in the bow cabin on the starboard side.

For sailing downwind the design may be equipped with a symmetrical spinnaker.

Variants
Schock 35
This fin keel model was introduced in 1984. It displaces  and carries  of ballast.
Schock 35 WK
This wing keel-equipped model was also introduced in 1984. It displaces  and carries  of ballast.

Operational history
The boat was once is supported by a class club that organized racing events, the Schock 35 Class Association.

See also
List of sailing boat types

Related development
Santana 35

References

External links

Keelboats
1980s sailboat type designs
Sailing yachts
Sailboat type designs by W. Shad Turner
Sailboat types built by W. D. Schock Corp